The Princelings, also translated as the Party's Crown Princes, are the descendants of prominent and influential senior communist officials in the People's Republic of China. It is an informal, and often derogatory, categorization to signify those benefiting from nepotism and cronyism, by analogy with crown princes in hereditary monarchies. Many of its members hold high-level political and business positions in the upper echelons of power. Opportunities are available to princelings that are not available to common people. Using their powerful connections they have the opportunity to obtain profitable opportunities for themselves and for others. The more aggressive of the princelings have amassed fortunes of hundreds of millions of dollars. However, there is no discernible political cohesion within the group, and as such they should not be compared to other informal groupings such as the Shanghai clique or the Tuanpai ("Youth League clique"), which resemble intra-party factions with some degree of affinity on policy issues.

In Mainland China, the term initially came into use during the Cultural Revolution to describe Lin Biao's son Lin Liguo as well as his close friends and allies who had been promoted alongside him into elite positions of the People's Liberation Army Air Force who were envisioned as the future "Third Generation" leadership of the CCP. Following the death of Lin Liguo in a failed coup and the subsequent purges of this group, the term briefly fell out of use until the 1980s to label the children of the Eight Elders and other First and Second Generation leaders who had been increasingly promoted in the party and were opposed to the efforts of reformers Hu Yaobang and Zhao Ziyang to curb corruption and cronyism. Notable contemporary Princelings include Xi Jinping (son of Xi Zhongxun), China's top leader and Party General Secretary since 2012, and Bo Xilai (son of Bo Yibo), a former Party Committee Secretary of Chongqing who was also a member of the Politburo.

History
The term was coined in the early 20th century in the Republic of China, referring to the son of Yuan Shikai (a self-declared emperor) and his cronies. It was later used to describe the relatives of the top four nationalist families; Chiang Kai-shek's kin, Soong Mei-ling's kin, Chen Lifu's kin, and Kong Xiangxi's kin. After the 1950s, the term was used in Taiwan to describe Chiang Ching-kuo, son of Chiang Kai-shek, and his friends. The latest generation of "crown princes" are in mainland China. Many senior leaders often lobby directly or indirectly for their descendants and relatives to succeed them.

Xiang Lanxin, professor of international history and politics at the Graduate Institute of International and Development Studies, explains it thus: Historically, how to control local officials who possessed imperial lineage was always a problem. The Politburo is equivalent to the inner circle of the imperial household. Its members, if assigned a local administrative position, can easily overrule any opposition in their jurisdictions as no other party officials can match them in rank and prestige.
Some of these crown princes are able to hold senior positions at the vice-ministerial level or above while still in their thirties, for which other ordinary cadres would struggle for decades. Others run companies involved in large- scale corruption and smuggling schemes. All of these misdeeds raise widespread sentiments of resentment and jealousy, and some "crown princes" have fallen victim to the trend towards enmity that is apparent in China. Most political observers see the Princelings as having been at the pinnacle of their power in the 1980s and to have had their power reduced after 1989 for a number of reasons:

First, not only did the Princelings cause resentment among the general public, but they also caused resentment within the vast majority of Party members who did not have a powerful relative; for example, Chen Yuan, son of Chen Yun; and Chen Haosu, son of Chen Yi lost their election in Beijing and had to be transferred to other positions.

Second, the booming Chinese economy caused a new wealthy class to emerge, many of whom demanded fair play and protection of their property.

Third, as the public was unsatisfied with the plague of corruption and cronyism, with resentment and discontent mounting to a degree that could wreak havoc on the CCP's reign, the CCP had to take measures to appease these strong feelings.

One watershed event occurred during the 15th National Congress of the CCP in 1997, when several prominent Princelings suffered great losses as candidates. Xi Jinping, son of Xi Zhongxun, and Deng Pufang, eldest son of Deng Xiaoping, were narrowly elected as alternate members of the Central Commission of the CCP, but were listed at the very bottom, due to the low number of votes received. Bo Xilai, son of Bo Yibo, was unable to get elected as an alternate member. However, both Xi and Bo emerged as major figures in China's next generation of leadership in 2007 (though Bo fell from power in 2012). Indeed, Xi succeeded Hu Jintao as General Secretary at the 18th Party Congress in 2012, and became president in 2013.

It is speculated that when Jiang Zemin was close to the end of his term for his age, he put many Princelings into important positions to appeal to senior leaders of the CCP and win their support for his continued influence. There is a trend towards Princelings taking over power step by step. Of these, Yu Zhengsheng, son of Huang Jing, former mayor of Tianjin, was already a member of the powerful politburo of the CCP; Wang Qishan, son-in-law of Yao Yilin (former vice premier and member of politburo), mayor of Beijing; Xi Jinping, Bo Xilai, Zhou Xiaochuan, son of Zhou Jiannan (former minister of the First Machinery Ministry and Jiang Zemin's former boss), governor of the People's Bank of China, have also occupied important positions since the 17th Party Congress.

In 2013 a "sons and daughters" program instituted by JPMorgan Chase to hire young princelings for positions in its Chinese operations came to light during a bribery investigation by the SEC. At times standards for hiring young princelings were more lenient than those imposed on other Chinese.

At least twelve of the princelings were revealed to have used companies in the offshore tax haven of the British Virgin Islands to store wealth in an investigation by the International Consortium of Investigative Journalists.

The leader or Godfather of the Princelings was Ye Xuanning, the second son of Ye Jianying. Ye Xuanning was low-profile but influential in political, military and business circles. Many people who ran into troubles looked for Ye and Ye was known for being able to resolve their problems.

Examples

The following are some of the most famous crown princes:
Son of Ye Jianying: Ye Xuanning, the leader of the Princelings
Son of elder Xi Zhongxun: Xi Jinping, General Secretary of the CCP, President of China, Chairman of the Central Military Commission.
Son and daughters of former leader Deng Xiaoping: Deng Pufang, honorary chairman of the Handicapped Association; Deng Nan, former vice minister Science and Technology; Deng Rong, deputy president of the China Association for International Friendly Contact
Son of former President Li Xiannian: Li Ping, high-ranking military official, daughter Li Xiaolin Chairperson of Chinese People's Association for Friendship with Foreign Countries, son in law Liu Yazhou (husband of Li Xiaolin) Political Commissar, National Defense University.
Son of elder Chen Yun: Chen Yuan, governor of the China Development Bank (1998—2013)
Son of elder Bo Yibo: Bo Xilai, former secretary of the CCP of Chongqing, and by extension, his own son, Bo Guagua.
Son of Zeng Shan (former interior minister of CCP): Zeng Qinghong, former Politburo Standing Committee member, vice-president of China, and, by extension, his own son, Zeng Wei, who purchased a $32.4 million property in Sydney, Australia. Zeng's source of income is unknown.
Son of Huang Jing: Yu Zhengsheng, former Politburo Standing Committee member and the Chairman of the CPPCC National Committee.
Son in law of Yao Yilin: Wang Qishan, vice-president of China, former Politburo Standing Committee member and the Secretary of the Central Commission for Discipline Inspection.
Son and daughter of former Premier Li Peng (as son of a martyr and protégé of Zhou Enlai, a member of Crown Prince Party, too): Li Xiaopeng, Governor of Shanxi, former chairman of Huaneng Power Group; Li Xiaolin, president of China Power International Development.
Sons of former General Secretary Jiang Zemin: Jiang Mianheng, vice dean of the Chinese Academy of Science, director of several major SOEs such as SAIC; Jiang Miankang, a major general of the PLA
Son of Wang Zhen, Wang Jun chairman of CITIC; Wang Zhi, former chairman of Great Wall Group
Son of former President Liu Shaoqi: Liu Yuan, lieutenant general of the military police
Son of Marshal He Long, He Pengfei, Deputy Commander in Chief of the Chinese Navy, Vice-Admiral
Former son-in-law of General Liu Huaqing: Pan Yue, vice director of the State Environmental Protection Administration
Son of Marshal Chen Yi: Chen Haosu, former vice minister of the Ministry of Culture
Grandson of former leader Mao Zedong, Mao Xinyu, major general of the PLA.
Son of former Premier Wen Jiabao: Wen Yunsong (Winston Wen), chairman of China Satellite Communications Corporation

A list of 226 princelings has been published (see link below).

Popular Culture

In late 2015 and early 2016 the term "Zhao family" from Lu Xun’s novella The True Story of Ah Q, went viral in China after it was used in an anonymous article “Barbarians at the Gate, Zhao Family Inside” to allude to princelings involvement in a business dispute.

See also
Hua Jing Society
Li Gang incident
Zhao family
Mazhory, a similar Russian term
Fuerdai

References

External links

中共太子党名单及任职一览表 (2004版) (A list of names of "Crown Princes").
China's former 'first family' about the children of Deng Xiaoping
The Princelings, John Garnaut, Sydney Morning Herald, 2 October 2010]
"China's 'Princelings' Pose Issue for Party, Jeremy Page, The Wall Street Journal, 26 November 2011

Factions of the Chinese Communist Party
Politics of China